The tenth season of the Russian reality talent show The Voice premiered on October 8, 2021, on Channel One. On August 16, 2021 Channel One announced that Dima Bilan, Pelageya, Alexander Gradsky and Leonid Agutin would be returning as coaches after a three-season break. Dmitry Nagiev returned as the show's presenter. This was also the first time in The Voice franchise history that coaches from the inaugural season returned for the anniversary season.

On November 28, 2021, one of the coaches, Alexander Gradsky, died during the season. At the time of his death, 8 episodes of the show were broadcast, 2 episodes were filmed. The press service of Channel One announced that the season will be over in memory of Gradsky.

Alexandr Volkodav was announced the winner on December 30, 2021, marking Pelageya's first win as a coach after five attempts and the second female coach to win in the show's history, behind Polina Gagarina. Pelageya became the first coach in the history of the Russian Voice who won all versions of the show;  winning the fifth season of The Voice Kids and in the first and second season of The Voice Senior

Teams
Colour key

Blind auditions
Color key

Episode 1 (October 8)
The coaches performed «All You Need Is Love» at the start of the show.

Episode 2 (October 15)

Episode 3 (October 22)

Episode 4 (October 29)

Episode 5 (November 5)

Episode 6 (November 12)

The Battles 
The Battle Rounds will be starting on November 19, 2021. No steal were available. Contestants who win their battle would advance to the Knockout rounds.
Colour key

The Knockouts
The Knockout Rounds started on December 3, 2021. Similar to the previous season, each coach pairs three artists into one knockout with only one contestant from the trio advances to the next round and also can steal one losing artist from another coach. The top 12 contestants moved on to the Quarterfinal. The Knockouts were filmed 10 days before the death of Alexander Gradsky.
Colour key

Live shows 
Colour key:

Week 1: Top 12 — Quarterfinal (December 17)
The Live Top 12 Quarterfinal comprised episode 11. The top twelve artists performed, with two artists from each team advancing based on the sum of the viewers' and coach's votes. In the case of Gradsky's team, the two people with the most public votes will advance into the semi-final.

Week 2: Top 8 — Semifinal (December 24)
The top eight artists performed on December 24, 2021, with one artist from each team advancing to the Final based on the sum of the viewers' and coach's votes

Week 3: Final (December 30)
As like the previous seasons, the winner will be determined through public votes alone. The artist with the highest percentage of votes will be declared as the winner.

Alexandr Volkodav was announced the winner, marking Pelageya's first win as a coach after five attempts. Pelageya became the first coach in the history of the Russian Voice who won all versions of the show and third coach (following Sarah Geronimo of Phlilippine version and Hadise of Turkish version) in all franchises of the Voice around the world that managed to win in three different versions of The Voice (winning the fifth season of The Voice Kids and in the first two seasons of The Voice Senior).

Notes

References

2021 Russian television seasons
The Voice (Russian TV series)